Ozem may refer to:

Otzem, a moshav in southern Israel
Ozem (biblical figure), a minor biblical figure